The 1988–89 season was Burnley's fourth season in the fourth tier of English football. They were initially managed by Brian Miller until Frank Casper took charge in January 1989.

Appearances and goals

|}

Matches

Football League Division Four
Key

In Result column, Burnley's score shown first
H = Home match
A = Away match

pen. = Penalty kick
o.g. = Own goal

Results

Final league position

FA Cup

League Cup

Football League Trophy

References

1988-89
Burnley